Abidu (also Romanized as Ābīdū) is a village in Gughar Rural District, in the Central District of Baft County, Kerman Province, Iran. At the 2006 census, its population was 13, in 4 families.

References 

Populated places in Baft County